The Constitution of India in Article 263, provided that an Inter-State Council (ISC) may be established  "if at any time it appears to the President that the public interests would be served by the establishment of a Council". Therefore, the constitution itself did not establish the ISC, because it was not considered necessary at the time the constitution was being framed, but kept the option for its establishment open. This option was exercised in 1990. Therefore, the ISC was established as a permanent body on 28 May 1990 by a presidential order on recommendation of Sarkaria Commission.  Moreover, the Commission on Centre-State Relations under the Chairmanship of Justice R. S. Sarkaria had recommended that a permanent Inter-State Council called the Inter-Governmental Council (IGC) should be set up under Article 263. The ISC has been established pursuant to this recommendation of the commission. It cannot be dissolved and re-established. Therefore, the current status of ISC is that of a permanent constitutional body. The objective of the ISC is to discuss or investigate policies, subjects of common interest, and disputes among states.

Aims 
	Decentralisation of powers to the states as much as possible.
	More transfer of financial resources to the states.
	Arrangements for devolution in such a way that the states can fulfil their obligations.
	Advancement of loans to states should be related to as ‘the productive principle’.
	Deployment of Central Armed Police Forces in the states either on their request or otherwise.

Composition
The Inter-State Council composes of the following members:
 Prime Minister, Chairman.
 Chief Ministers of all states.
 Chief Ministers of the union territories having legislative assemblies. 
 Lieutenant Governors and Administrators of the union territories not having legislative assemblies.
 6 Union Cabinet Ministers, including Union Home Minister, to be nominated by the Prime Minister.
 Governors of the states being administered under President's rule.

Standing Committee
 Union Home Minister, Chairman
 5 Union Cabinet Ministers
 9 Chief Ministers

Meetings
The Council has met 12  times since its inception (1990).

References

State governments of India
Councils of India